Maggy Ashmawy (born 1 October 1992) is an Egyptian sport shooter. She represented Egypt at the 2019 African Games and won the gold medal in the women's trap event. She also won gold in the mixed trap event together with Ahmed Kamar.

In 2021, she competed in the women's trap event at the 2020 Summer Olympics held in Tokyo, Japan.

References

External links 
 

Living people
1992 births
Egyptian female sport shooters
Competitors at the 2019 African Games
African Games medalists in shooting
African Games gold medalists for Egypt
Shooters at the 2020 Summer Olympics
Olympic shooters of Egypt
Sportspeople from Cairo
21st-century Egyptian women